Melaleuca citrolens, commonly known as gulbarn, is a plant in the myrtle family, Myrtaceae and is endemic to northern Queensland and the north-eastern part of the Northern Territory. Plants in this species were originally included in Melaleuca acacioides until a review of the genus in 1986.

Description

The stamens are arranged in five bundles around the flower, each bundle containing 7 to 11 stamens. Flowers appear from December to February and from April to June.

Taxonomy and naming
Melaleuca citrolens was first formally described in 1986 by Bryan Barlow in Brunonia as a new species. The specific epithet (citrolens) refers to the Rutaceae genus Citrus (which includes the orange and lemon) and to the Latin word olens meaning "smelling" or "odorous", apparently referring to the aromatic foliage.

Distribution and habitat
This melaleuca is found in the north-eastern part of the Northern Territory and the northern part of Queensland including the Cape York Peninsula and occurs in melaleuca heath in association with species such as Melaleuca stenostachya, Thryptomene oligandra and Melaleuca arcana.

References 

citrolens
Myrtales of Australia
Flora of the Northern Territory
Flora of Queensland
Plants described in 1986